Pennsylvania State Senate District 45 includes part of Allegheny County. It is currently represented by Democrat Jim Brewster.

District profile
The district includes the following areas:

Allegheny County:

Senators

Recent election results

References

Government of Allegheny County, Pennsylvania
Government of Westmoreland County, Pennsylvania
Pennsylvania Senate districts